Rugbyclub Turnhout is a Belgian rugby club in Turnhout.

History
The club was founded in 2008, although there had been an earlier team called The Jokers Turnhout.

References

Belgian rugby union clubs
Rugby clubs established in 2008
Rugbyclub Turnhout